Brian Mayes may refer to:

 Brian Mayes (British Army officer) (1934–2019), British general in the Royal Army Medical Corps
 Brian Mayes (cricketer) (born 1950), English cricketer
 Brian Mayes, Winnipeg City Councillor first elected in 2010, see Winnipeg City Council

See also
 Brian May (born 1947), British musician
 Brian May (Australian composer) (1934–1997)